The Alliance Furnace, also known as Jacob's Creek Furnace and the Alliance Iron Works, is an historic iron furnace, which is located in Perry Township, Fayette County, Pennsylvania.

It was added to the National Register of Historic Places in 1991.

History and architectural features
Built in 1789, the Alliance Furnace is a stone structure measuring twenty-five feet square by fifteen feet high. 

 Also located on the same property is a charcoal house which measures . It was built as a blast furnace, placed in blast in 1792 and closed in 1802.

The Alliance Furnace was added to the National Register of Historic Places in 1991.

References

Industrial buildings and structures on the National Register of Historic Places in Pennsylvania
Industrial buildings completed in 1789
Buildings and structures in Fayette County, Pennsylvania
1789 establishments in Pennsylvania
National Register of Historic Places in Fayette County, Pennsylvania